Hartmannswillerkopf, also known as the Vieil Armand (French) or Hartmannsweiler Kopf (German; English: Hartmansweiler Head) is a pyramidal rocky spur in the Vosges mountains of the Grand Est region, France. The peak stands at  overlooking the Rhine valley. At Hartmannswillerkopf stands a national monument of World War I for the fighting which took place in the trenches here.

Mountain peak
The mountain is shared by the towns of Hartmannswiller, Wuenheim, Wattwiller and Uffholtz.

Battle

The French and Germans fought for control of the mountain peak during the First World War. Fighting took place throughout 1915. An estimated 25,000 French soldiers died there. After about 11 months of fierce combat, both sides began to focus most of their attention farther north on the Western Front. Only enough men to hold the lines were left at Hartmannswillerkopf. The lines remained relatively stable for the remainder of the war and generally only artillery exchanges took place.

National monument

Today, the area is a French national monument. There is a museum and a cemetery at the site, and it is also possible to explore the extensive trench system. Because the lines were static for such a long period, the trenches are very well preserved, especially on the German side of the front line.

There is a small memorial on the D431 north of Vieil Armand, commemorating Halifax bomber MZ807 of No. 433 Squadron RCAF, which crashed nearby in December 1944.

On 3 August 2014, French President Francois Hollande and German President Joachim Gauck together marked the centenary of Germany's declaration of war on France by laying the first stone of a memorial at Hartmannswillerkopf, for French and German soldiers killed in this area during the war. On 10 November 2017 French President Emmanuel Macron and German President Frank-Walter Steinmeier inaugurated the new memorial.

Gallery

References

External links
 official website of the National Monument of the Hartmannswillerkopf (English) 
 The Memorial Centre in Uffholtz (French)
 Website of Hartmannswillerkopf Charity association (French)

World War I memorials in France
Buildings and structures in Haut-Rhin
Mountains of Haut-Rhin
Monuments historiques of Haut-Rhin
Museums in Haut-Rhin
Geography of Haut-Rhin
Tourist attractions in Haut-Rhin
World War I museums in France
Mountains under 1000 metres
Mountains of the Vosges
Hartmannswillerkopf